Henri Congnet (6 December 1795 – 5 July 1870) was a 19th-century French secular Catholic priest and historian, also a member of the Société asiatique and hagiographer.

Selected publications 
 Marie honorée dans les classes ou Mois de Marie (Grec-Latin) Extrait des Pères de l’Église grecque et des Saintes Écritures ; ouvrage contenant, en outre, les hommages rendus par quelques littérateurs contemporains à Marie de Nazareth – Paris 1837
 Grammaire grecque accompagnée d'exercices et de questionnaires – Paris 1838
 Le Maitre d'études des collèges royaux et communaux – Paris 1845
 Grand manuel ou Manuel pratique pour la première communion et la confirmation – Paris 1858
 Madame de Bussières ou La vie chrétienne et charitable au milieu du monde – Dédié aux mères chrétienne – Paris 1867
 Soldat et prêtre ou Le modèle de la vie sacerdotale et militaire (L'abbé Timothée Marprez) Paris 1865
 Notice sur la translation des reliques de Yved de Rouen et Victricius en la ville de Braine – Paris 1865
 Enchiridion (manuel) de ceux qui commencent le grec, pour servir de premier texte d'explication – Paris 1847 (1re édition)
 Grammaire de la langue grecque comparée perpétuellement à la langue latine – Paris 1845
 Joseph, Ruth, Tobiy et extraits bibliques suivis de quarante-six fables d'Aesop, pieces by Claudius Aelianus et autres auteurs et des fables choisies de Babrius, avec les exercices grammaticaux et les renvois perpétuels à la grammaire... ouvrage formant une chrestomathie élémentaire... Texte grec – Paris 1850 (1re édition)
 Le Livre des jeunes professeurs, contenant : première partie, la méthode pour commencer les humanités – Paris 1843
 Le Pieux helléniste sanctifiant la journée par la prière. Grec-Latin – Paris 1839
 Manuel des verbes irréguliers, défectifs et difficiles de la langue grecque, avec des exercices – Paris 1837
 [paradigmes des verbes grecs et résumé des règles de la formation de leurs temps – Paris 1837
 Prosodie grecque after the paintings by François Passow – Paris 1848
 Collaboration à l'écriture de l'ouvrage hagiographique Vies des Saints, Les Petits Bollandistes – 1870

Bollandiste: name given to the drafters of the lives of saints

External links 
 
 
 

Canons (priests)
19th-century French historians
Hagiographers
Members of the Société Asiatique
1795 births
People from Soissons
1870 deaths